Abantiades leucochiton is a moth of the family Hepialidae. It is endemic to Australia, where it is found in New South Wales, South Australia and Victoria.

The larvae are subterranean and feed on the roots of Casuarina and Allocasuarina  species.

References

Moths described in 1914
Hepialidae
Moths of Australia